Dijiao is a station of Line 1 of the Wuhan Metro, opened along with the completion of Line 1 (Phase 2) on July 29, 2010. It is an elevated station situated on Jiefang Avenue, with easy access to Dijiao Park and bus transfers to Hankou North. The station has two side platforms. Trains terminating at Dijiao Station uses a single crossover to access the westbound platform. The eastbound platform has entered fared service for Line 1's Hankou North extension on July 28, 2014.

Station layout
Dijiao Station is a three-story elevated station built entirely along Jiefang Avenue.

Exits
There are currently two exits in service.
Exit A: Northwest side of Jiefang Avenue
Exit B: Southeast side of Jiefang Avenue. Accessible to Dijiao Park.

Transfers
Dijiao station is adjacent to Dijiao Bus Depot. Bus transfers to Route 3, 211, 212, 234, 509, 592, and 623 are available.

References

Wuhan Metro stations
Line 1, Wuhan Metro
Railway stations in China opened in 2010